Star Quest: The Odyssey is a 2009 low budget American science-fiction film directed by Jon Bonnell, written by Carlos Perez, and starring Aaron Ginn-Forsberg, Davina Joy and Tamara McDaniel. The film was released on November 3, 2009.

External links
 
 

2009 films
Films set in the future
2009 science fiction films
2000s English-language films